The siege of Florence was a battle that occurred in either 405 or 406 AD, between the Goths and the Roman Empire at Florence.

Background  
In 402 the Geougen, a nomadic Tartar people of northern Asia, who during the fourth century had gradually supplanted the Sienpi as the dominant people in the vast plains of Mongolia and Siberia, extended their conquests further by a victory over the Huns on the upper Volga, who had themselves formerly been the masters of the regions from which their victors issued. Impelled westwards by this inroad of the east-Asian hordes, the Huns retreated further into Europe, and in turn drove from their homeland the Suevi, Vandals, and Burgundians, who had occupied central Europe from the Vistula to the Elbe.

Radagaisus, a bold warrior from the area of modern Mecklenburg, assumed command of a formidable portion of these tribes, who determined to unite for the invasion of the Roman Empire, in whose territory they hoped to find ample space for settlement, undisturbed by the constant attacks of the more savage Asian barbarians who were overrunning the areas of modern Poland and Germany.
 
In late 405 or early 406, Radagaisus with his vast army, which he recruited with some of the wandering tribes of the Alani, as well as some of Alaric's Goths, who were disaffected with their recent defeat, broke over the undefended Danube frontier, and entered Rhaetia. Stilicho, master-general of the west, had recently stripped the further provinces, including those of the Rhine and Danube, of their regular garrisons in order to repel Alaric's first invasion of Italy. Thus, Radagaisus was able to cross the Alps into Italy before meeting any resistance from Stilicho.

The battle 
Radagaisus marched south into Italy, leaving behind him the destroyed farmlands and cities of the province, while Stilicho took up his quarters in Pavia, which he declared the rendezvous point for the Roman and auxiliary barbarian forces which he called from every direction for the defence of Italy. In the meantime, the cowardly figurehead of the western empire, Honorius, took refuge in the fortified city of Ravenna, which had been designated the capital of the west (in place of the more exposed Milan) after Alaric's invasion in 401.

For unknown reasons, Radagisus halted on his march to Rome to besiege the large and prosperous city of Florence. The town was defended by a small garrison, but with conspicuous devotion and patriotism. When the defenders of the city flagged in the face of the unremitting barbarian assault, their spirits were revived by the well-timed report of Bishop Ambrose of Milan's appearance in a nocturnal vision to a citizen of the city, in which he promised the intercession of providence for the succour of the inhabitants. Not long afterwards, Stilicho arrived with his army and broke up the besieging barbarian army in the decisive battle of Faesulae (406).

References

Bibliography

400s conflicts
Florence
Florence 405
Battles in Tuscany
History of Florence
405
5th century in Italy
Battles involving the Huns